Democratic Rally may refer to:
 Democratic Rally, a political party in Cyprus
 Democratic Rally (Senegal), a political party in Senegal
 Democratic Rally of the Tahitian People, a former political party in French Polynesia
 African Democratic Rally, a former political party in French West Africa and French Equatorial Africa
 Central African Democratic Rally, a political party in the Central African Republic
 Dahomey Democratic Rally, a former political party in Dahomey
 Martinican Democratic Rally, a political party in Martinique
 Oceanian Democratic Rally, a political party in New Caledonia

See also 
 National Democratic Rally (disambiguation)
 Democratic Coalition (disambiguation)
 Democratic Party (disambiguation)
 Democrat Party (disambiguation)